1796 in sports describes the year's events in world sport.

Boxing
Events
 "Gentleman" John Jackson announced his retirement to leave the Championship of England a vacant title. 
 14 November — Tom Owen, said to be the inventor of the dumbbell, claimed the Championship of England after a 40th round victory over William Hooper at Harrow. Owen held the title until August 1797.

Cricket
Events
 Inter-county matches were played for the last time until 1825, a victim of the loss of investment suffered by English cricket as the Napoleonic Wars escalated.
England
 Most runs – John Tufton 306
 Most wickets – Lord Frederick Beauclerk 42

Horse racing
England
 The Derby – Didelot
 The Oaks – Parisot
 St Leger Stakes – Ambrosio

References

 
1796